Joel Brutus (born August 12, 1974) is a male judoka from Haiti, who won the silver medal in the men's heavyweight division (+ 100 kg) at the 2003 Pan American Games.

He represented his native country at two consecutive Summer Olympics, starting in 2004 in Athens, Greece. Brutus carried the Haitian flag at the opening ceremony of the 2008 Summer Olympics in Beijing, PR China.

References

1974 births
Living people
Haitian male judoka
Judoka at the 2004 Summer Olympics
Judoka at the 2008 Summer Olympics
Judoka at the 2003 Pan American Games
Judoka at the 2007 Pan American Games
Olympic judoka of Haiti
Pan American Games silver medalists for Haiti
Pan American Games bronze medalists for Haiti
Pan American Games medalists in judo
Central American and Caribbean Games silver medalists for Haiti
Central American and Caribbean Games bronze medalists for Haiti
Competitors at the 2006 Central American and Caribbean Games
Central American and Caribbean Games medalists in judo
Medalists at the 2003 Pan American Games
Medalists at the 2007 Pan American Games
21st-century Haitian people